Comarca de Alcalá is an historical comarca of Castile, located in what is now the east of the Community of Madrid, in Spain.

Its head or capital city is Alcalá de Henares. Officially the Community of Madrid is not subdivided into formal comarcas; however, informally some governmental institutions have defined some shires according to different views. The shire of Alcalá doesn't figure in any of these partitions. The territory is made up by two natural sub-shires, La Campiña and Alcarria de Alcalá.

Etymology 
Its name comes from the Arabic القلعة (Al-Qal'at) whose means "the castle", referring to the first of the Muslim castles placed along the banks of the Henares River.

Comarcas of the Community of Madrid